The Wiluna Gold Mine is an inactive gold mine in Western Australia near the town of Wiluna. The mine was active from 1984 until its closure in 2007 when it was put into care and maintenance, and again from late 2008 to June 2013 when the owners, APEX Minerals, went into receivership. Following this, the mine had been placed in care and maintenance again in 2013. In January 2014 it was announced that the mine would be sold to Blackham Resources, with the deal to be finalised by March 2014. Mining resumed in 2016 and Blackham was renamed to Wiluna Mining Corporation in 2020. In July 2022, the Wiluna Mining Corporation entered voluntary administration, with mining ceasing in December 2022 and processing in February 2023.

The mine is located on the native title of the Ngaanyatjarra Aboriginal people.

Overview 

The mine consists of several open pits, the largest being East Pit which was mined until July 2007 and again in late 2008 and early 2009, and three underground operations. Two of those, Happy Jack and East Lode, are older workings; the third, Bulletin decline was also mined until July 2007 and has since reopened. Bulletin and its extensions, Calais and Woodley decline were the sites of an underground drilling program during the mines closure in 2007 and 2008. There was then approx. 15 km of underground workings at the mine. Most of the open pits are flooded with salt water. Only one of them, the small Caledonia Pit, contains fresh water. It is home to long neck turtles and yabbies (a fresh water crustacean).

The current owner, Apex Minerals, upgraded and reopened the mine in November 2008. It originally also planned to transport ore to the Wiluna plant from its other mine sites, the Gidgee Gold Mine (approx. 150 km south) and the Youanmi Gold Mine (approx. 300 km south). After having postponed this plan in 2009, APEX reconsidered this option in September 2009, when its Wiluna-focused strategy failed.

Williamson pit, an open pit in the dry salt lake of Lake Way, was also mined by Agincourt until early 2007 but is now abandoned. The mining lease was still with Oxiana Limited after the sale of Wiluna, Oxiana having had plans to mine rich uranium deposits there through Toro Energy Limited in the foreseeable future. There are other mining companies that were carrying out exploration in the Wiluna area too, notably for nickel and iron ore. There is also an older mine site approximately 25 km south of Wiluna, along the road to Leinster, called Wiluna South or Matilda Mine. It was operated for about 10 years until 1989 by Chevron. Apart from a couple of old pits and tailings dams there is little remaining of the old site.

One of the few historical buildings from the earlier days of mining is the old Mine Managers Lodge, currently a private residence. There also is some old equipment on display at the visitors' car park, notably an old crusher and an old mill. The Wiluna area was extensively mined from the discovery of gold there in 1896 until the end of World War II when mining ceased.

Just before entering Wiluna from the south, a wooden building on the right-hand side is the old railway station's shed. In front of it, the railway dam can still be seen but the tracks which once went all the way to Leinster have been removed.

The mine is connected to Perth through flights out of Wiluna Airport and serviced by Maroomba Airlines.

Mine history

Discovery
In 1896, gold was discovered in the region, which was then known as Lake Way, by three prospectors, George Woodley, James Wotton and Jimmy Lennon.

The location it was found at was later to become the spot for the power house of the Wiluna Gold Mine Limited, the operators of the early mine.

The town prospered from the development of the mine until the First World War. In 1920 however, a decline set in because the refractory ore could not be treated. As a consequence, the town's population shrank to less than 150 people.

Second phase
In 1924, Claude de Bernales floated a company that would undertake a drilling program and the Wiluna mine was revived. De Bernales went to London in 1926 and raised £1 million to work Wiluna mines. A later issue of promissory notes for £300,000 was backed by the State government. When the mine reopened in 1931 it attracted a substantial workforce and stimulated community growth and within four years produced gold worth £3 million. From 1931 to 1934, Frank T. M. White, memorialized by the University of Queensland in naming the Frank White Building, and by the Canadian Mineral Industry Education Foundation and McGill University in the FTM White Award, obtained his initial mining and milling experience at Wiluna. By 1939, the town had grown to a population of 9,000 thanks to the employment the mine provided.

With the outbreak of the Second World War, Wiluna started to decline once more as the men had to join the services. The mine lasted for some more years until 1947, when all machinery was sold off and Wiluna went into a form of hibernation.

Third phase
The third reincarnation of Wiluna mines, after 1896 and 1924, started in the early 1980s. Unlike the previous two before, the town did not profit from it as much. Fly-in fly-out rosters meant there was no significant population growth. From 1987 to 1994, oxide ore was mined from open pit operations; from 1994 onwards, underground operations commenced.

On 21 August 1997, Great Central Mines made an offer for Wiluna Mines Limited, owner of Wiluna at the time. This offer closed on 10 October 1997 and was followed by a second offer, lasting until 2 January 1998. GMC acquired the necessary 90% acceptance in the second offer and moved to compulsory acquisition on 5 January 1998.

The mine went through a number of owners during this time, being sold in package with the Bronzewing Gold Mine and the Jundee Gold Mine when Great Central Mines was taken over by Normandy Mining in June 2000. Normandy, in turn, was taken over by the Newmont Mining Corporation in February 2002.

Agincourt

2003–2007

Having gone through a number of owners in its time, the Wiluna mine was owned by the Agincourt Resources since December 2003. Gowit Limited purchased Agincourt Resources, and thereby the mine, on 10 December 2003 from the previous owner, Newmont for shares and $3.65 million in cash. Newmont later acquired almost 20% of Agincourt when it sold its Martabe mine to the later in July 2006.

A fatality occurred at the mine when, on 1 July 2005, an employee of Mining and Civil Australia Pty Ltd was killed at the Williamson pit. The man was crushed while helping to jump-start a truck.

Agincourt was bought out in April 2007 by Oxiana Limited. The acquisition brought Oxiana the Martabe gold project in Indonesia, the Wiluna Gold Mine, a 57% interest in Nova Energy Limited, a listed uranium explorer, and numerous exploration properties. Oxiana offered 0.65 of its shares for every Agincourt share, a deal worth $415 million. Oxiana in turn sold on the Wiluna Gold Mine in July 2007, making them the shortest owner of the site.

At the time of the purchase of the mine by Oxiana, it had only one year of mine life left and approx. 300,000 ounces of gold in reserves.

APEX

2007
Having purchased the mine in July 2007 for A$ 29.5 million and placed it into care and maintenance from then on, APEX carried out an assessment of the necessary upgrades required to Wiluna for its three-mine strategy.

2008
On 19 March 2008, APEX announced the raising of $62 million to fund the company's program to resume gold production at the Wiluna Gold Mine by the end of 2008. The company announced a loss in excess of $60 million for the financial year up to 30 June 2008. Despite the loss, it paid out a bonus of $100,000 to each of its three executive directors, increasing their combined wage, including options, from $1,086,861 (2006–07) to $2,715,923 (2007–08).

The company raised a further $58.5 million in September 2008 to be able to continue its projects. Of this, $30 million were earmarked for exploration activities while the remainder was to go towards protecting the company from the exposure to the Australian dollar gold price and the start up of its operations, which were scheduled for Wiluna for October 2008, for Gidgee in February 2009 and for Youanmi in the second half of 2009. Production for the 2009 calendar year was scheduled at 150,000 ounces, rising to 200,000 the following year.

Delays in the commissioning of the mills were announced on 9 December 2008, making a start of full production in 2008 impossible; however full throughput was achieved. The difference between full production and full throughput is the large residence time required by the BIOX process. Apex announced its first gold pour on 22 December 2008. To compensate for these delays, APEX announced on 27 January 2009 the raising of a further $20 million to cover the shortfall in revenue, bringing the overall figure of investment in Wiluna and related projects to $140 million. This was achieved by issuing a further 72.5 million shares. It further declared that production had reached 7,000 ounces per month and would ramp up to the expected 120,000 ounces per year in February 2009. APEX also considered the option to claim certain amounts of the costs involved in the upgrade from the previous owner, formerly Oxiana, now OZ Minerals. In May 2010, APEX reached a settlement with OZ Minerals, receiving $3 million in compensation.

In its quarterly activities report for the three-month up to end of December 2008, the company declared a gold production of 385 ounces. In March 2009 the company announced that it had reached full production, averaging 290 ounces of Gold per day for February.

2009
APEX announced yet another capital raising on 18 May 2009, receiving $28 million through share placement and increasing the money invested in the Wiluna project to $168 million. APEX stated lower than expected production in their underground operations as their reason for this further capital raising.

For the second quarter of 2009, the company declared it had reached its production target of 30,000 ounces of gold per month. Its cash costs however were at $952, almost $400 above the company's target of $560. APEX projected that it could cut production costs per ounce by $40 for every additional 1,000 ounces produced each month. While the mining operations in Wiluna itself in the June 2009 quarter achieved a profit of $9,995,000, the company suffered an overall loss of $113,762,000 for the 2008–09 tax year.

In a low-key announcement on 31 July 2009, APEX declared that Glenn Jardine, director of operations, had resigned from his position without stating any reasons for his departure.

On 22 September 2009, APEX declared a trading halt to its shares and the possibility that it may go into voluntary suspension of trading to receive enough time to complete another capital raising. After having deviated from its original three-mine strategy and only processed ore from the Wiluna operations, leaving the Gidgee and Youanmi operations in care and maintenance, the company now decided to return to multiple feed for its Wiluna processing facility, the one feed strategy having failed. To achieve this, it raised enough money to cover its debt and regain $50 million in working capital. With its current debt level estimated to be around $60 million, the company had to raise another $110 million, bringing its investment into its gold mining operations to around $300 million.

2010
APEX returned to its previously abandoned strategy of sourcing ore from Gidgee as well as Wiluna for its processing facility. It planned to commence mining at Gidgee once more in March 2010 and transport ore to Wiluna. In late December 2009, APEX announced a further delay with the development of the Gidgee mine because of the need of an upgrade of the Gidgee–Wiluna road. APEX anticipated that mining could be delayed another two or three-month, but, as of the end of July 2010, no further mention of the Gidgee mine being reopened has been made. APEX put up its Younami mine for sale in April 2010, abandoning its strategy to source ore from there for the Wiluna mine.

The company announced a trading halt on 4 August 2010, in the wake of a loss of A$20 per ounce of gold produced in the June quarter, despite cutting costs and boosting production at the Wiluna mine. APEX, cash strapped and feared to be teetering on the brink of collapse, planned to raise A$5 million through another capital raising. The company issued 250 million new shares at 2 cents per share and resumed trading on 6 August.

After continued loses at the operation, the mine achieved a profitable quarter in late 2010, being able to reduce operating cost to below A$900 per ounce for the first time. It also increased cash reserves from A$180,000 to over one million.

2011
On 27 January, APEX announced a trading halt for the purpose of yet another capital raising, an asset sale and a restructuring. The company sold the Gidgee Gold Mine to Panoramic Resources, with APEX retaining the rights to the Wilson deposit. Panoramic purchased the mine for A$15.5 million. It also raised A$22.6 million through a share placement.

After continuous production improvements in 2010, the first quarter in 2011 was a disappointment, with lower production and grade figures and higher operating costs. Reasons for the slip in production were power outages, reduced availability of underground hauling and loading equipment and rain affecting the operation.

2012
After coming close to collapse in early 2010, APEX once more experienced financial difficulties in late 2011 with claims that it was unable to pay its employees. After continuing production shortfalls and high production costs the company announced another capital raising in February 2012. After entering voluntary suspension on the ASX, APEX was able to announce the plan to raise A$20 million on 7 March 2012. As part of the capital rising the managing director of APEX, Mark Ashley, would resign and be replaced with Ed Eshuys, a former exploration manager of Great Central Mines and managing director of St Barbara.

2013
Apex Minerals announced on 17 May 2013 that it had signed a final sale and purchase agreement with Oz Youanmi Gold Pty Ltd (formerly Infinity Fame Pty Ltd) for the sale of the Youanmi Gold Project ("Youanmi").
Apex Minerals advised on 20 May 2013 that it had terminated the memorandum of understanding with Everprosperity Investment Co Ltd ("Everprosperity") for the sale of the Wiluna Gold Mine ("Wiluna").
Following a series of mechanical breakdowns and finally the breakdown of part of the Power Station, the receivers, Ferrier and Hodgson, were called in by the main creditor, RF Capital, on 25 June 2013. The mine was put into care and maintenance on 1 July 2013.
On 19 July 2013, Ferrier Hodgson advertised for expressions of interest for the project's assets or for participation in a financial reorganisation of the companies.

Blackham Resources–Wiluna Mining Corporation
In January 2014 it was announced that Blackham Resources, under chairman Joseph Gutnick, had acquired the Wiluna Gold Mine. Gutnick, as chairman of Great Central Mines, had previously held the Wiluna mine from 1997 to 2000. Edward Eshuys, last chairman of APEX Minerals, was also in charge of the drilling program that discovered the Plutonic deposit for Gutnick in 1988. The sale was scheduled to be finalised by 18 February, however this deadline could be extended to 7 March 2014. The mine was sold for A$2 million in cash and another $A2.6 million on meeting certain production targets.

Mining at the Wiluna Gold Mine recommenced in mid-2016 from sources at both the Wiluna and the former Matilda mine, with the first gold pour taking place in October 2016.

Blackham Resources was rebranded as the Wiluna Mining Corporation in early 2020.

In May 2021, WMC secured funding to expand the mines annual production capacity from 60,000 to 120,000 ounces of gold, with the long-term plan to raise this to 250,000 ounces per annum. To carry out the first stage of the expansion, the company secured A$93 million in funding. At this point, mining was carried out both above and underground, with the open pit operations concluding in the second half of 2021.

On 21 July 2022, the Wiluna Mining Corporation entered voluntary administration but intended to continue operating the Wiluna Gold Mine. Mining ceased in December 2022 while processing of ore continued until February 2023, after which the mine was placed in care and maintenance again.

BIOX process
The BIOX process is a pretreatment process for refractory gold ores or concentrates, using naturally occurring bacteria to break down the sulphide ore and liberate the gold for subsequent cyanidation. The advantage of the BIOX process is its environmental friendliness. BIOX was first commercially used in 1988 and the Wiluna plant was installed in 1993.

Production

1984 to 2007
Pre-APEX production figures were:

 1 December 2003 (sale of mine to Agincourt) to June 2004 only.
 2 July to December 2006 only.
 Mine closed in July 2007.

2008 onwards
Since resumption of production in December 2008, the company has announced the following production figures:

Blackham Resources–Wiluna Mining Corporation
Annual production under the ownership of Blackham Resources, later renamed to Wiluna Mining Corporation:

Owners

Further reading
 Phil R. Heydon: Wiluna: Edge of the Desert, published: 1996, publisher: Hesperian Press

References

Bibliography

External links 
 
 MINEDEX website: Matilda Database of the Department of Mines, Industry Regulation and Safety
 MINEDEX website: Wiluna Gold Database of the Department of Mines, Industry Regulation and Safety

Gold mines in Western Australia
Underground mines in Australia
Surface mines in Australia
Newmont
Wiluna, Western Australia